The Able was a small French cyclecar made in Avignon by Paul Toulouse, built between 1920 and 1927.  

It was a fairly ordinary 4-cylinder light car that utilized engines from companies such as SCAP, Chapuis-Dornier and CIME, ranging from 1100 cc to 1500 cc.  Some cars were sold under the name "Toulouse".

References
Georgano, G.N., "Able", in G.N. Georgano, ed., The Complete Encyclopedia of Motorcars 1885-1968  (New York: E.P. Dutton and Co., 1974), pp. 25.

Vintage vehicles
Defunct motor vehicle manufacturers of France
Cyclecars